CHIMES Society is an international academic collaboration whose objective is to establish new stroke treatments.

CHIMES is a Singaporean non-profit society founded by a group of key opinion leaders in stroke, Southeast Asia regional experts, and clinicians interested in implementing a research project on Traditional Chinese Medicine efficacy on stroke recovery.

Current research project
CHIMES society has received a grant in 2007 from Singapore National Medical Research Council which has allowed the initiation of a double-blind, randomized, placebo-controlled clinical trial in October 2007. The trial includes 1,100 patients and aims at measuring the efficacy of NeuroAid in reducing neurological deficit and improving functional outcome in patients with cerebral infarction.

Prior research projects
Clinical studies were conducted in China from 1999 to 2001 and the results have been submitted for publication. Since publication is pending, further information will be provided here when the publication is released.

References

External links
 http://www.chimes-society.org

Neurology organizations
Stroke organizations
Medical and health organisations based in Singapore